There are several known allotropes of oxygen. The most familiar is molecular oxygen, present at significant levels in Earth's atmosphere and also known as dioxygen or triplet oxygen. Another is the highly reactive ozone. Others are:
Atomic oxygen, a free radical.
Singlet oxygen, one of two metastable states of molecular oxygen.
Tetraoxygen, another metastable form.

Atomic oxygen

Atomic oxygen, denoted O(3P) or O(3P), is very reactive, as the single atoms of oxygen tend to quickly bond with nearby molecules. On Earth's surface, it exists naturally for a very short time. In outer space, the presence of ample ultraviolet radiation results in a low Earth orbit atmosphere in which 96% of the oxygen occurs in atomic form.

Atomic oxygen has been detected on Mars by Mariner, Viking, and the SOFIA observatory.

Dioxygen

The common allotrope of elemental oxygen on Earth, is generally known as oxygen, but may be called dioxygen, diatomic oxygen, molecular oxygen, dioxidene or oxygen gas to distinguish it from the element itself and from the triatomic allotrope ozone, . As a major component (about 21% by volume) of Earth's atmosphere, elemental oxygen is most commonly encountered in the diatomic form. Aerobic organisms use atmospheric dioxygen as the terminal oxidant in cellular respiration in order to obtain chemical energy. The ground state of dioxygen is known as triplet oxygen, because it has two unpaired electrons. The first excited state, singlet oxygen, has no unpaired electrons and is metastable. The doublet state requires an odd number of electrons, and so cannot occur in dioxygen without gaining or losing electrons, such as in the superoxide ion or the dioxygenyl ion.

The ground state of  has a bond length of 121 pm and a bond energy of 498 kJ/mol. Liquid oxygen is pale blue in colour, and is quite markedly paramagnetic due to the unpaired electrons; liquid oxygen contained in a flask suspended by a string is attracted to a magnet.

Singlet oxygen

Singlet oxygen is the common name used for the two metastable states of molecular oxygen with higher energy than the ground state triplet oxygen. Because of the differences in their electron shells, singlet oxygen has different chemical and physical properties than triplet oxygen, including absorbing and emitting light at different wavelengths. It can be generated in a photosensitized process by energy transfer from dye molecules such as rose bengal, methylene blue or porphyrins, or by chemical processes such as spontaneous decomposition of hydrogen trioxide in water or the reaction of hydrogen peroxide with hypochlorite.

Ozone

Triatomic oxygen (ozone) is a very reactive allotrope of oxygen that is a pale blue gas at standard temperature and pressure. Liquid and solid  have a deeper blue color than ordinary , and they are unstable and explosive. In its gas phase, ozone is destructive to materials like rubber and fabric and is damaging to lung tissue. Traces of it can be detected as a pungent, chlorine-like smell, coming from electric motors, laser printers, and photocopiers, as it is formed whenever air is subjected to an electrical discharge. It was named "ozon" in 1840 by Christian Friedrich Schönbein, from ancient Greek ὄζειν (ozein: "to smell") plus the suffix -on, commonly used at the time to designate a derived compound and anglicized as -one.

Ozone is thermodynamically unstable and tends to react toward the more common dioxygen form. It is formed by reaction of intact  with atomic oxygen produced when UV radiation in the upper atmosphere splits . Ozone absorbs strongly in the ultraviolet and in the stratosphere functions as a shield for the biosphere against mutagenic and other damaging effects of solar UV radiation (see ozone layer). Tropospheric ozone is formed near the Earth's surface by the photochemical disintegration of nitrogen dioxide in the exhaust of automobiles. Ground-level ozone is an air pollutant that is especially harmful for senior citizens, children, and people with heart and lung conditions such as emphysema, bronchitis, and asthma. The immune system produces ozone as an antimicrobial (see below).

Cyclic ozone

Cyclic ozone is a theoretically predicted  molecule in which its three atoms of oxygen bond in an equilateral triangle instead of an open angle.

Tetraoxygen

Tetraoxygen had been suspected to exist since the early 1900s, when it was known as oxozone. It was identified in 2001 by a team led by Fulvio Cacace at the University of Rome. Cacace's team suggested that  probably consists of two dumbbell-like  molecules loosely held together by induced dipole dispersion forces.

Phases of solid oxygen

There are six known distinct phases of solid oxygen. One of them is a dark-red  cluster. When oxygen is subjected to a pressure of 96 GPa, it becomes metallic, in a similar manner to hydrogen, and becomes more similar to the heavier chalcogens, such as selenium (exhibiting a pink-red color in its elemental state), tellurium and polonium, both of which show significant metallic character. At very low temperatures, this phase also becomes superconducting.

References

Further reading

 

Oxygen